Zhadan (Russian or Ukrainian: Жадан) is a gender-neutral Slavic surname. It may refer to:
Marina Zhadan (better known as Mari Kraimbrery; born 1992), Ukrainian and Russian musician
Serhiy Zhadan (born 1974), Ukrainian writer

See also
 

Ukrainian-language surnames